Edgemont School District may refer to:

 Edgemont Union Free School District, New York State, USA
 Edgemont School District (South Dakota), USA